Fox-Pitt Kelton Cochran Caronia Waller (formerly Fox-Pitt, Kelton or FPK) was an investment bank focused on mergers and acquisitions advisory services, private placements of debt and equity as well as equity research.  FPK specialised in transactions involving financial institutions and financial services companies.

The firm, which had eight offices globally in London, New York, Chicago, Hartford, San Francisco, Boston, Hong Kong and Tokyo had approximately 285 employees, including 60 research analysts and 60 employees in sales and trading.

It was acquired by Macquarie Group in November 2009.

History
The firm was founded in 1971 by Oliver Fox-Pitt and Robin Kelton, with assistance from Len Caronia.  After expanding to the U.S. in the 1980s, FPK launched Eldon, a financial services focused investment manager, in 1994 (Eldon was sold to Hiscox in 2003).

Under Swiss Re's ownership, the firm expanded further globally, entering Asia.

A consortium led by private equity firm J.C. Flowers & Co. and the bank's management  led by Giles Fitzpatrick, CEO, purchased Fox-Pitt from Swiss Reinsurance Co. in February 2006.  Lazard investment banker Gary Parr also invested in Fox-Pitt.

Under management and private equity ownership, the firm acquired another investment boutique, Chicago-based Cochran Caronia  Waller (CCW) in 2007. CCW was founded in 1997 as Cochran Caronia & Co by George Cochran, Leonard Caronia and John Waller and was renamed Cochran Caronia  Waller in 2006.  Like FPK, it specialised in financial services, focusing on the property-casualty, life and health sectors.  Among the notable transactions in which the firm was involved, FPK, and its co-owner J. Christopher Flowers, advised Bank of America on its acquisition of Merrill Lynch in 2008.

Macquarie's acquisition of Fox-Pitt Kelton was completed in November 2009.

References

Further reading 

Fox-Pitt in flower.  The Deal, September 19, 2008

External links
Fox-Pitt, Kelton (company website)

Former investment banks of the United States
British companies established in 1971
Financial services companies established in 1971
Banks established in 1971
Financial services companies of the United Kingdom
Companies based in London
1971 establishments in England
Investment banks in the United Kingdom
Mergers and acquisitions
Multinational companies based in the City of London
2009 mergers and acquisitions
Privately held companies of the United Kingdom